Donkin is a surname. Notable people with the surname include:
 Billy Donkin (1900–1974), British footballer
 Bryan Donkin (1768–1855), British engineer, inventor and industrialist
 Bryan Donkin (physician) (1842–1927), British physician
 George Donkin (1892–1927), English footballer
 John Donkin (1802–1854), British engineer
 Dylan Donkin (21st century), American musician
 Mike Donkin (1951–2007), English reporter and journalist
Nance Donkin (1915–2008), children's writer and journalist
 Peter Langloh Donkin (1913–2000), Air Commodore
 Robin Donkin (1928–2006), British historian and geographer
 Rufane Shaw Donkin (1773–1841), British soldier
 Sydney Donkin (1871–1952), British engineer
 William Fishburn Donkin (1814–1869), professor of astronomy at Oxford